The 2011 Women's County One-Day Championship was the 15th cricket Women's County Championship season. It ran from April to September and saw 33 county teams and teams representing Ireland, Scotland, Wales and the Netherlands compete in a series of divisions. Kent Women won the County Championship as winners of the top division, with Sussex finishing second. The Championship was Kent's fourth title, and their first of two titles in 2011, as they later won the 2011 Women's Twenty20 Cup.

Competition format 
Teams played matches within a series of divisions with the winners of the top division being crowned County Champions. Matches were played using a one day format with 50 overs per side.

The championship worked on a points system, with placings decided by average points of completed games. Due to restructuring ahead of the 2012 season, which had divisions of nine teams compared to six in 2011, there was no relegation and more teams were promoted per division. The points are awarded as follows:

Win: 10 points + bonus points. 
Tie:  5 points + bonus points. 
Loss: Bonus points.
Abandoned or cancelled: Match not counted to average.

Bonus points are awarded for various batting and bowling milestones. The bonus points for each match are retained if the match is completed.

Batting

1.50 runs per over (RPO) or more: 1 point
2 RPO or more: 2 points
3 RPO or more: 3 points
4 RPO or more: 4 points

Bowling

3-4 wickets taken: 1 point
5-6 wickets taken: 2 points
7-8 wickets taken: 3 points
9-10 wickets taken: 4 points

Teams
The 2011 Championship was divided into five divisions: Divisions One to Four with six teams apiece and Division Five with 13 teams split across three regional groups.

Teams in each group played each other twice.

Division One 

Source: ECB Women's County Championship

Division Two 

Source: ECB Women's County Championship

Division Three 

Source: ECB Women's County Championship

Division Four 

Source: ECB Women's County Championship

Division Five

East 

Source: ECB Women's County Championship

North 

Source: ECB Women's County Championship

South & West 

Source: ECB Women's County Championship

Play-offs 

Source: ECB Women's County Championship

Statistics

Most runs

Source: CricketArchive

Most wickets

Source: CricketArchive

References

 
2011
cricket
cricket
cricket